Furnishina is an extinct genus of conodonts in the family Furnishinidae from the Cambrian.

The genus name is a tribute to American paleontologist William M. Furnish.

References

External links 
 

 
 Furnishina at fossilworks.org (retrieved 8 May 2016)

Paraconodontida
Conodont genera
Cambrian conodonts

Cambrian genus extinctions